Yvonne Hutton née Mullins, (born 31 October 1941, died March 1992) was a British comics artist best known for her work on the football series Roy of the Rovers.

While attending Poole Art College, Hutton got work in comics through Colin Page's studio. She drew the "Roy of the Rovers" strip in Tiger from 1967 to 1975, and again in 1976–78, as well as a number of back-up strips in Roy of the Rovers weekly, including "Durrell's Palace" (1981–85), "Wayne's Wolves" (1985–86) "Kevin's Chance" (1986–87) "City" (1987–88), and "Terrible Twins" (1988–89). Her Roy of the Rovers covers were known to be "Powerful and Dynamic" during the early 70s. She also drew the Roy of the Rovers daily strip in the Daily Star and was the first artist to draw the story when it first appeared. Hutton had a car accident in December 1991, which eventually resulted in her death three months later in March 1992. Her final Roy of the Rovers strip was published in the Star on 17th January 1992.

References

1941 births
1992 deaths
20th-century British women artists
British comics artists
British female comics artists
British women illustrators
Road incident deaths in the United Kingdom
Female comics writers